The 1989 Pilkington Glass Championships was a women's tennis tournament played on grass courts at the Devonshire Park Lawn Tennis Club in Eastbourne, United Kingdom that was part of the Category 5 tier of the 1989 WTA Tour. It was the 15th edition of the tournament and was held from 19 June until 25 June 1989. First-seeded Martina Navratilova won the singles title.

Finals

Singles

 Martina Navratilova defeated  Raffaella Reggi 7–6(7–2), 6–2
 It was Navratilova's 4th singles title of the year and the 142nd of her career.

Doubles

 Katrina Adams /  Zina Garrison defeated  Jana Novotná /  Helena Suková 6–3 (Novotná and Suková retired)
 It was Adams' fifth doubles title of the year and the ninth of her career. It was Garrison's third doubles title of the year and the twelfth of her career.

References

External links
 ITF tournament edition details
 Tournament draws

Pilkington Glass Championships
Eastbourne International
Pilkington Glass Championships
Pilkington Glass Championships
1989 in English women's sport